The Yeerung River is a perennial river located in the East Gippsland region of the Australian state of Victoria.

Course and features
Formed by the confluence of the Yeerung River West Branch and the Yeerung River East Branch, the Yeerung River rises in the Cape Conran Coastal Park, and flows generally south before reaching its mouth with Bass Strait, east of Cape Conran in the Shire of East Gippsland. The river descends  over its  course.

The Yeerung River sub-catchment area is managed by the East Gippsland Catchment Management Authority.

See also

 List of rivers of Australia

References

External links
 
 
 

East Gippsland catchment
Rivers of Gippsland (region)